Aldo Geraldo Manuel Monteiro (born 30 November 1994), known as Kadú, is an Angolan professional footballer who plays for Portuguese club Alverca as a goalkeeper.

Club career
Kadú was born in Porto Amboim. He moved to Portugal in his early teens, playing for four youth clubs and finishing his formation with FC Porto, who also loaned him to Padroense F.C. who acted as the farm team in 2009. On 12 May 2012, in the last day of the season and as the side had already been crowned national champions, he made his Primeira Liga debut, coming on as a late substitute for Rafael Bracalli in a 5–2 away win against Rio Ave FC.

In August 2015, after two full seasons with the reserves in the Segunda Liga, often as starter, Kadú joined Varzim S.C. of the same league on loan. After spending 2016–17 with C.D. Trofense in the third division he signed for U.D. Oliveirense, recently promoted to the second tier.

International career
Kadú was called up by Angola in September 2020. He only made his debut one year later, however, replacing Hugo Marques who had just been diagnosed with COVID-19 prior to the 0–1 home loss to Libya for the 2022 FIFA World Cup qualifiers.

Honours
Porto
Primeira Liga: 2011–12

References

External links

1994 births
Living people
People from Cuanza Sul Province
Angolan footballers
Association football goalkeepers
Primeira Liga players
Liga Portugal 2 players
Campeonato de Portugal (league) players
Padroense F.C. players
FC Porto players
FC Porto B players
Varzim S.C. players
C.D. Trofense players
U.D. Oliveirense players
S.C. Espinho players
F.C. Alverca players
Angola international footballers
Angolan expatriate footballers
Expatriate footballers in Portugal
Angolan expatriate sportspeople in Portugal